Lawrence Sherman Terrell (January 11, 1906 – March, 1965), sometimes spelled "Tirrell", and nicknamed "Lefty", was an American Negro league pitcher in the 1920s.

A native of Moberly, Missouri, Terrell made his Negro leagues debut in 1924 with the Detroit Stars, and played for Detroit again the following season. He died in 1965 at age 59.

References

External links
 and Seamheads

1906 births
1965 deaths
Place of death missing
Date of death missing
Detroit Stars players
20th-century African-American sportspeople
Baseball pitchers